Atlético Hidalgo, nicknamed Toltecas is a Mexican football team which plays in the Tercera División de México. It is based in Pachuca and was founded in 1992.

History
Atlético Hidalgo was an expansion club that joined the Primera A in 1996. Along with Real Sociedad de Zacatecas they expanded the primera A from 18 to 20 clubs. That year the club reached the final and faced Tigres, losing 3-1. The club won the first game 1-0 in Pachuca but lost 3-0 in Monterrey.

In 1997, the club again reached the play off and once again lost to Tigres, 5-4. In 1998, the club was sold to Toluca F.C. which moved the club to Toluca and changed the name to Atlético Mexiquense. Since then, the club has returned to action and plays under the name Club Deportivo Atlético Hidalgo, A.C'' in the Tercera División de México.

 Honours Primera A: 0'''
Runner-up (1): 1996

External links
 Forum

Football clubs in Hidalgo (state)
Puebla F.C
1996 establishments in Mexico